Uli Bayerschmidt (born 3 March 1967) is a German former professional footballer who played as a defender.

Career
Born in Munich, Bayerschmidt began his career with Bayern Munich, and made his debut for the club in October 1986, as a substitute for Holger Willmer in a European Cup match against PSV Eindhoven. Bayern reached the competition's final that season, and Bayerschmidt was an unused substitute as they lost against FC Porto. They also won the Bundesliga title, with Bayerschmidt making one appearance, replacing Michael Rummenigge in a 3–2 win over Werder Bremen. He made a further three appearances the following year, and the last match of the season brought his first goal – he scored Bayern's second as they turned around a 3–0 deficit against Bayer Leverkusen to win 4–3. However, Werder Bremen had already wrapped up the title, so Bayern finished in second place.

Bayerschmidt only made one appearance for Bayern during the first half of the 1988–89 season, in a UEFA Cup match against Legia Warsaw, so he left during the winter break to sign for 1. FC Nürnberg. He made 41 appearances for Nürnberg in the next two years, but didn't feature in the first team after November 1990, and left at the end of the 1990–91 season to sign for Hertha BSC of the 2. Bundesliga. He made over 80 appearances for Hertha in the next three years, before signing for neighbours Tennis Borussia Berlin in 1994. He spent three years with TeBe, the last of which saw them win the Regionalliga Nordost title, but they were denied promotion to the 2. Bundesliga after a defeat in the playoff against VfB Oldenburg. Bayerschmidt retired from football at the end of the 1995–96 season.

Honours 
 Bundesliga: 1986–87
 European Cup: Runner-up 1986–87

References

External links 
 

1967 births
Living people
German footballers
Association football defenders
Bundesliga players
2. Bundesliga players
FC Bayern Munich footballers
FC Bayern Munich II players
1. FC Nürnberg players
Hertha BSC players
Tennis Borussia Berlin players
Footballers from Munich
West German footballers